In mathematics, in the realm of group theory, a group is said to be superperfect when its first two homology groups are trivial: H1(G, Z)  = H2(G, Z) = 0. This is stronger than a perfect group, which is one whose first homology group vanishes. In more classical terms, a superperfect group is one whose abelianization and Schur multiplier both vanish; abelianization equals the first homology, while the Schur multiplier equals the second homology.

Definition 
The first homology group of a group is the abelianization of the group itself, since the homology of a group G is the homology of any Eilenberg–MacLane space of type K(G, 1); the fundamental group of a K(G, 1) is G, and the first homology of K(G, 1) is then abelianization of its fundamental group. Thus, if a group is superperfect, then it is perfect.

A finite perfect group is superperfect if and only if it is its own universal central extension (UCE), as the second homology group of a perfect group parametrizes central extensions.

Examples 
For example, if G is the fundamental group of a homology sphere, then G is superperfect.  The smallest finite, non-trivial superperfect group is the binary icosahedral group (the fundamental group of the Poincaré homology sphere). 

The alternating group A5 is perfect but not superperfect: it has a non-trivial central extension, the binary icosahedral group (which is in fact its UCE) is superperfect. More generally, the projective special linear groups PSL(n, q) are simple (hence perfect) except for PSL(2, 2) and PSL(2, 3), but not superperfect, with the special linear groups SL(n,q) as central extensions. This family includes the binary icosahedral group (thought of as SL(2, 5)) as UCE of A5 (thought of as PSL(2, 5)).

Every acyclic group is superperfect, but the converse is not true: the binary icosahedral group is superperfect, but not acyclic.

References
 A. Jon Berrick and Jonathan A. Hillman, "Perfect and acyclic subgroups of finitely presentable groups", Journal of the London Mathematical Society (2) 68 (2003), no. 3, 683--698. 

Properties of groups